Nealyda phytolaccae is a moth of the family Gelechiidae. It was described by Clarke in 1946. It is found in North America, where it has been recorded from Florida.

The larvae feed on Phytolacca decandra.

References

Moths described in 1946
Nealyda